The trigonometric Rosen–Morse potential, named after the physicists Nathan Rosen and Philip M. Morse, is among the exactly solvable quantum mechanical potentials.

Definition

In dimensionless units and modulo additive constants, it is defined as 

Another parametrization of same potential is

which is the trigonometric version of a one-dimensional hyperbolic potential introduced in molecular physics by Nathan Rosen and Philip M. Morse and given by,

a parallelism that explains the potential's name.

The  case: Four-dimensional rigid rotator in inertial quantum motion on the three dimensional hypersphere 

The hypersphere is a surface in a four-dimensional Euclidean space, and is defined as,

In now switching to polar coordinates,

one finds the Laplace operator expressed as

Here,  stands for the squared angular momentum operator in four dimensions, while  is the standard three-dimensional squared angular momentum operator.

With that the free wave equation on  takes the form

The solutions, to this equation are the so-called four-dimensional hyper-spherical harmonics  defined as

where  are the Gegenbauer polynomials. Changing in  variables as

one observes that  the  function satisfies the one-dimensional Schrödinger equation with the  potential according to

Now the question arises whether the second term in  could also be related in some way to the  geometry.

Due to this analogy, the cotangent function is  frequently termed to as "curved Coulomb" potential. Such an interpretation ascribes the cotangent potential to a single charge source, and here lies a severe problem. Closed spaces are necessarily and inevitably charge neutral meaning that the minimal fundamental degrees of freedom allowed on them are charge dipoles (see Fig. 1).

For this reason, the wave equation

which  transforms upon the variable change, into the familiar one-dimensional Schrödinger equation with the  trigonometric Rosen–Morse potential,

in reality describes quantum motion of a charge dipole perturbed by the field due to another charge dipole, and not the motion of a single charge within the field produced by another charge.

Rather, it is necessary to prove that the cotangent function represents a dipole potential. Such a proof has been delivered in. For this purpose, a "time" variable is introduced via the logarithm of the  radius. Introducing this variable change in  amounts to the following Laplacian,

The  parameter is known as "conformal time", and the whole procedure is referred to as "radial quantization".

where we have chosen , equivalently, .

Then the correct equation to be employed in the calculation of the fundamental solution is
 

. 

This Green function to 
 
has been calculated for example in. 

and

In now assuming validity of the superposition principle, one encounters a Charge Dipole (CD) potential to emerge at a point  on  according to

The electric field to this dipole is obtained in the standard way through differentiation as

Notice that  stands for dimension-less charges. In terms of dimensional charges, related to  via

the potential perceived by another charge , is

For example, in the case of electrostatic, the fundamental charge  is taken the electron charge, in which case the special notation of

is introduced for the so-called fundamental coupling constant of electrodynamics. In effect, one finds

With that, the one-dimensional Schrödinger equation that describes on  the quantum motion of an electric charge dipole perturbed by the trigonometric Rosen–Morse potential, produced by another electric charge dipole, takes the form of

Because of the relationship, with  being the node number of the wave function, one could change labeling of the wave functions, to the more familiar in the literature, .

In this manner, the complete trigonometric Rosen–Morse potential could be derived from first principles.

This is by eight orders of magnitudes larger than the H Atom size. The result has been concluded from fitting magnetic dipole elements to hydrogen hyper-fine structure effects (see } and reference therein). The aforementioned radius is sufficiently large to allow approximating the hyper-sphere locally by plane space in which case the existence of single charge still could be justified. In cases in which the hyper spherical radius becomes comparable to the size of the system, the charge neutrality takes over. Such an example will be presented in section 6 below.

Before closing this section, it is in order to bring the exact solutions to the equations-(), given by

where  stand for the Romanovski polynomials.

Application to Coulomb fluids

Coulomb fluids consist of dipolar particles and are modelled by means of direct numerical simulations. It is  commonly used to choose cubic cells with periodic boundary conditions in conjunction with Ewald summation techniques. The potential of a bi-charge is calculated by solving on  the Poisson equation,

Here,  is the angular coordinate of a charge  placed at angular position , read off from the North pole, while  stands for the anti-podal to  angular coordinate of the position, at which the charge of opposite signs is placed in the Southern hemisphere. The solution found,

It provides an alternative proof to that delivered by the equations-() of the fact that the cotangent function on  has to be associated with the potential generated by a charge dipole.
The pseudo-charge potential, solves .
Therefore, the bi-charge potential is the difference between the potentials of two antipodal pseudo-charges of opposite signs.

Application to color confinement and the physics of quarks

The confining nature of the cotangent potential in  finds an application in a phenomenon known from the physics of strong interaction which refers to the non-observability of free quarks, the constituents of the hadrons. Quarks are considered to possess three fundamental internal degree of freedom, conditionally termed to as "colors", red , blue , and green , while anti-quarks carry the corresponding anti-colors, anti-red , anti-blue , or anti-green , meaning that the non-observability of free quarks is equivalent to the non-observability of free color-charges, and thereby to the "color neutrality" of the hadrons. Quark "colors" are the fundamental degrees of freedom of the Quantum Chromodynamics (QCD), the gauge theory of strong interaction. However, at low momentum transfer, near the so-called infrared regime, the momentum dependence of the color charge significantly weakens, and in starting approaching a constant value,

drives the Gauss law back to the standard form known from Abelian theories. For this reason, under the condition of color charge constancy, one can attempt to model the color neutrality of hadrons in parallel to the neutrality of Coulomb fluids, namely, by considering quantum color motions  on closed surfaces.

i.e. the potential

Especially, the hydrogen like degeneracies have been well captured.

The  geometry could be viewed as the unique closed space-like geodesic of a four-dimensional hyperboloid of one sheet, foliating outside of the causal Minkowski light-cone the space-like region, assumed to have one more spatial dimension, this in accord with the so-called de Sitter Special Relativity, . Indeed, potentials, in being instantaneous and not allowing for time orderings, represent virtual, i.e. acausal processes and as such can be generated in one-dimensional wave equations upon proper transformations of virtual quantum motions on surfaces located outside the causal region marked by the Light Cone. Such surfaces can be viewed as geodesics of the surfaces foliating the space like region. Quantum motions on open  geodesics can give rise to barriers describing resonances transmitted through them.

(32)
previous section, qualifies it to studies of phase transitions in systems with electromagnetic or strong interactions on
hyperspherical "boxes" of finite volumes 
. The virtue of such studies lies in the
possibility to express the temperature, as the inverse, to the radius  of the hypersphere. In the following we evaluate  for the case of the  Schrödinger equation on
 with linear energy (here in units of MeV),

where  is the reduced mass of the two-body system under consideration. The
partition function (statistical mechanics) for this energy spectrum is defined in the standard way as,
 
 

Boltzmann constant. In evaluating   it is useful to recall that  with the increase of 
the second term on the right hand side in  becomes negligible compared to the term proportional , a
In both cases  is
much smaller compared to the corresponding dimensionless factor, multiplying . For this reason the partition function under investigation might be well approximated by,

Along same lines, the partition function for the  parametrization corresponding to the Hydrogen atom on 
has been calculated in, where a more sophisticated approximation has been employed. When transcribed to
the current notations and  units, the partition function in  presents itself as,

 
The infinite integral has first been treated by
means of partial integration giving,

Then the argument of the exponential under the sign of the integral has been cast as,

thus reaching the following intermediate result,
 

As a next step the differential has been represented as

an algebraic manipulation which allows to express  the partition function in
() in terms of the  function of complex argument according to,

where  is an arbitrary path on the complex plane starting in zero and ending in
. For more details and physical interpretations, see.

See also

 Romanovski polynomials
 Pöschl–Teller potential

References

Quantum mechanical potentials
Mathematical physics